Fox River is a stream in Davis, and
Van Buren counties of Iowa, and Clark County of Missouri. It is a tributary of the Mississippi River.

The stream headwaters are at  near Drakesville and Bloomfield, Iowa.

Fox River was named after the Fox Indians. 

At Wayland, Missouri, the river has an average discharge of 283 cubic feet per second.

See also
List of rivers of Iowa
List of rivers of Missouri

References

Rivers of Iowa
Rivers of Missouri
Rivers of Davis County, Iowa
Rivers of Guthrie County, Iowa
Rivers of Van Buren County, Iowa
Rivers of Clark County, Missouri